Sherman Township is a civil township of St. Joseph County in the U.S. state of Michigan, located just north of Sturgis.  The population was 3,248 at the 2000 census.

Communities
Chapin Lake was an unincorporated community on the lake of the same name.
Crossman Lake was an unincorporated community.  It was started by Abel Crossman in 1840.

Geography
According to the United States Census Bureau, the township has a total area of 35.0 square miles (90.6 km), of which 33.1 square miles (85.7 km) is land and 1.9 square miles (4.8 km or 5.35%) is water. Major roads in the township include M-66, Banker Street Rd., Featherstone Rd., Shimmel Rd., and Balk Rd.

Demographics
As of the census of 2000, there were 3,248 people, 1,175 households, and 909 families residing in the township. The racial makeup of the township was 97.14% White, 0.65% African American, 0.18% Native American, 0.68% Asian, 0.03% Pacific Islander, 0.49% from other races, and 0.83% from two or more races. Hispanic or Latino of any race were 1.45% of the population.

There were 1,175 households, out of which 32.9% had children under the age of 18 living with them, 66.8% were married couples living together, 6.8% had a female householder with no husband present, and 22.6% were non-families. 18.0% of all households were made up of individuals, and 6.9% had someone living alone who was 65 years of age or older.  The average household size was 2.69 and the average family size was 3.05.

In the township the population was spread out, with 24.8% under the age of 18, 8.4% from 18 to 24, 28.0% from 25 to 44, 26.4% from 45 to 64, and 12.4% who were 65 years of age or older.  The median age was 39 years. For every 100 females, there were 104.7 males.  For every 100 females age 18 and over, there were 101.3 males.

The median income for a household in the township was $47,727, and the median income for a family was $54,291. Males had a median income of $38,106 versus $27,500 for females. The per capita income for the township was $20,904.  About 4.4% of families and 6.8% of the population were below the poverty line, including 6.9% of those under age 18 and 7.5% of those age 65 or over.

References

Notes

Sources

Townships in St. Joseph County, Michigan
Townships in Michigan